Javier Aguirresarobe Zubía (born 10 October 1948) is a Spanish cinematographer.

Life and career
Aguirresarobe was born in Eibar, Guipúzcoa, Basque Country, Spain. He has worked with Spanish directors such as Imanol Uribe, Montxo Armendáriz, Alejandro Amenábar and Pedro Almodóvar, and with Miloš Forman and Woody Allen. He has won six Goya Awards among other prizes. Aguirresarobe also worked as cinematographer for the film adaptation of New Moon, released on 20 November 2009. He continued his work for the Twilight film series with their other sequels in the series.

Filmography

Awards and nominations
Goya Awards

Sitges Film Festival

BAFTA Awards

San Diego Film Critics Society

Houston Film Critics Society

References

External links 

1948 births
Living people
People from Eibar
Basque artists
Spanish cinematographers